Baron Carl Nils Daniel Bildt (15 March 1850 – 26 January 1931) was a Swedish diplomat and historian. He spent most of his Foreign Office career as Swedish envoy in Rome and published extensively on Swedish historical topics relating to Rome and Italy.

Early life
A son of Gillis Bildt, he inherited the baronial title on his father's death in 1894.

Career
After a law degree from Uppsala and holding various lower-ranking diplomatic posts in London, Paris, Washington D.C., Berlin and Vienna, and as state secretary for foreign affairs, he was appointed Swedish envoy to Rome in 1889. He remained there until 1902 when he was transferred to the same position in London, but returned as envoy to Rome in 1905 and remained there as envoy until his retirement in 1920. He remained in Rome after retirement, died in 1931 and was buried in the Non-Catholic Cemetery for Foreigners there.

Throughout his years in Italy, Bildt published a number of works on Italian or Italo-Swedish topics, starting with his Anteckningar från Italien av en svensk diplomat ("Notes from Italy by a Swedish diplomat"), with historical descriptions of a number of Italian towns. He wrote essays on earlier Swedish visits to Italy, such as the one by King Gustav III in 1783, but his main focus was on Saint Bridget of Sweden who spent her last years in Rome and Queen Christina, who settled there after abdicating from the Swedish throne (1654) and converting to Roman Catholicism (1655). With his excellent connections in Rome, Bildt was able to access until-then unused sources in Roman public and private archives and published articles on many previously unknown episodes in and aspects of Christina's later life.

He was elected a member of the Swedish Academy in 1901 and was a member of several foreign academies.

Personal life
Bildt was married between 1 October 1874 and 15 November 1887 to Lilian Augusta Stuart Moore (17 October 1853 – 18 December 1911), the daughter of Bloomfield Haines Moore and Clara Jessup Moore of Philadelphia. On 15 September 1890 he married Hedvig Alexandra Keiller (born 30 August 1864), the daughter of Alexander Keiller.

Awards and decorations
   Commander Grand Cross of the Order of the Polar Star (1897)
   Commander 1st Class of the Order of the Polar Star (1889)
   Knight of the Order of the Polar Star (1884)
   Honorary Knight Grand Cross of the Royal Victorian Order

Honours
Member of the Royal Swedish Academy of Letters, History and Antiquities (1900)
Member of the Royal Society for Publication of Manuscripts on Scandinavian History (Kungliga Samfundet för utgivande av handskrifter rörande Skandinaviens historia) (1898)
Honorary doctor of philosophy at Uppsala University (31 May 1900)

References

Notes

Print
Vem är det? Svensk biografisk handbok 1925, ed. Göran Lindblad. Stockholm: Norstedt, 1924.
Vem är det? Svensk biografisk handbok 1933. Stockholm: Norstedt, 1932.

External links
 Article on Svenskt biografiskt lexikon 
 

1850 births
1931 deaths
Writers from Stockholm
20th-century Swedish historians
Members of the Swedish Academy
Ambassadors of Sweden to Italy
Ambassadors of Sweden to the United Kingdom
Swedish expatriates in the United States
Swedish expatriates in France
Honorary Knights Grand Cross of the Royal Victorian Order
Carl
19th-century Swedish historians
20th-century Swedish diplomats
19th-century Swedish diplomats